Armed Forces Insurance (AFI) is a reciprocal insurance exchange that provides property and casualty insurance to military professionals throughout the United States and overseas. AFI is headquartered in Leavenworth, Kansas, approximately 20 miles northwest of Kansas City, Missouri.

About Armed Forces Insurance
AFI's insurance coverages include auto, home, renter, life, business, flood, motorcycle, watercraft, motor home, pet health, umbrella, condo, mobile home, valuable items, and collector vehicle. All AFI members also receive free identity theft resolution and identity document recovery services in the event of a disaster. Another benefit of membership is a complimentary service that offers AFI members customizable, interactive tools to help increase home efficiency, save money, and inventory your personal property.

AFI is a "reciprocal exchange", a type of cooperative insurer in which the policyholders bear a relationship to each other. In effect, AFI is owned by the policyholders who are served.
 
The Subscribers' Advisory Committee (SAC), composed of active duty, reserve and retired military members, represents the insurance needs of members. The members of the SAC are also members of the Board of Directors, which oversees AFI business operations.

History

Armed Forces Insurance began on a frontier army post in 1887, when the Army Cooperative Fire Association was founded at Fort Leavenworth, Kansas. Thirty-eight officers of the garrison gathered to form this organization to provide low-cost fire insurance protection for their personal property tailored to the particular needs of regular army officers. They pledged their support to the Association (which later became Armed Forces Co-operative Insuring Association, and now Armed Forces Insurance Exchange).

Through the years, the organization evolved to include other types of insurance products for military members. Currently, both personal property and dwellings are protected against loss due to a number of perils. Personal liability insurance also is available, and personal automobile coverage is offered in a limited area.

In 1982, an affiliate organization, Armed Forces Insurance Exchange, was formed to operate as a licensed entity as states increasingly required insuring organizations to be licensed. On July 1, 1992, remaining Association assets and liabilities were transferred to the Exchange, and the merger between Armed Forces Insurance Cooperative and Armed Forces Insurance Exchange was complete. The formation of the Armed Forces Insurance Agency in 1999 allowed the company to partner with other insurers to offer a broader range of products and services to policyholders.

Membership eligibility

Those eligible for membership with Armed Forces Insurance include active duty, retired, or honorably discharged military, including National Guard and Reserves. Spouse or surviving spouse of an active duty, retired, or honorably discharged military, including National Guard and Reserves.  Active or retired Department of Defense (DoD) civilian employees.  Active, retired, or former commissioned officer of the National Oceanic and Atmospheric Administration (NOAA) or the Public Health Service (PHS).  Service Academy including Merchant Marine or ROTC cadet.  Former spouse of a current or former AFI member.  Child of a current or former AFI member.  Former AFI member (once a member, always a member!).

Corporate affiliations

AFI is a member of The National Association of Mutual Insurance Companies (NAMIC), a trade association for property/casualty insurance companies, and Property Casualty Insurers Association of America; a trade association that represents Armed Forces Insurance and other insurance companies before state and federal lawmakers. As a NAMIC member, AFI has national legislative representation and greater access to resources. AFI also is a corporate member of the Association of the United States Army (AUSA), a private, nonprofit organization that supports the Army—active duty, National Guard, Reserve, civilians, retirees and family members.

Leadership
The board of directors oversees the business operations of the attorney-in-fact. The directors serve for a three-year term and are elected by the Subscribers' Advisory Committee, which represents the subscribers' interests. The election occurs at the annual stockholders' meeting in June.

 2019–2020 board of directors
 Lieutenant General Stanley E. Clarke III, Air Force, retired – chairman, board of directors
 Colonel Joyce P. DiMarco, Army, retired – SAC chairman
 Colonel Myron J. (Mike) Griswold, Army, retired – SAC vice-chairman
 Ms. Dana M. Abella
 Ms. Becky S. Blades
 Mr. Thomas M. Fogt
 Colonel Norman D. Greczyn, Army, retired
 Mr. Paul E. Heacock
 Lieutenant Colonel Randy T. Johnson, Army, retired
 Ms. Lucille K. Pittard
 Mr. Kurt H. Seelbach – president / CEO (ex officio)
 Mr. Ken Seltzer
 Chief Master Sergeant Danny R. Walker, Air National Guard, retired
 Lieutenant Colonel Michael J. Yaguchi, Air Force, retired
 Mr. George J. Zock

 2015–2016 board of directors

 Garry L. Parks, lieutenant general, USMC, Ret. (Chairman)
 Antonio M. Taguba, major general, USA, Ret. 
 Craig M. Kennedy, commander, USN, Ret. (Vice Chairman and SAC Chairman)
 Dana Abella
 Becky Blades
 Joyce P. DiMarco, colonel, USA, Ret.(SAC Vice Chairman)
 Thomas M. Fogt
 Norman D. Greczyn, colonel, USA, Ret.
 Myron J. Griswold, colonel, USA, Ret.
 Paul E. Heacock
 Kurt H. Seelbach, president and chief executive officer (ex officio)
 Paul D. VanGorden, colonel, USAF, Ret.
 Danny R. Walker, chief master sergeant, ANG, Ret.
 George J. Zock

 2016 senior management

 Kurt H. Seelbach, CPA, CPCU, president & chief executive officer
 Arlen Briggs, CPA, chief financial officer and chief risk officer
 Kevin Lund, Vice President, chief information officer and chief innovation officer
 Michael Nixon, vice president, insurance operations and claims
 Lori Simmons, assistant vice president, marketing and communications

References

External links 
Armed Forces Insurance web site

Financial services companies established in 1887
Insurance companies of the United States
Companies based in Kansas
1887 establishments in Kansas